Desmometopa is a genus of freeloader flies in the family Milichiidae. There are more than 50 described species in Desmometopa.

Species
These 53 species belong to the genus Desmometopa:

Parectecephala aristalis (Coquillett, 1898)
Parectecephala dissimilis (Malloch, 1914)
Desmometopa aczeli Sabrosky, 1983
Desmometopa aldabrae Sabrosky, 1983
Desmometopa argentinica Sabrosky, 1983
Desmometopa atypica Sabrosky, 1983
Desmometopa blantoni Sabrosky, 1983
Desmometopa brachycephala Brake & Freidberg, 2003
Desmometopa ciliata Hendel, 1919
Desmometopa discipalpis Papp, 1993
Desmometopa dolichocephala Brake & Freidberg, 2003
Desmometopa evanescens Sabrosky, 1983
Desmometopa flavicornis Brake & Freidberg, 2003
Desmometopa flavicoxa Hendel, 1932
Desmometopa flavipalpis Sabrosky, 1983
Desmometopa floridensis Sabrosky, 1983
Desmometopa glabrifrons (Sabrosky, 1965)
Desmometopa glandulifera Brake & Freidberg, 2003
Desmometopa glaucanota Sabrosky, 1983
Desmometopa gressitti Sabrosky, 1983
Desmometopa inaurata Lamb, 1914
Desmometopa indistincta Sabrosky, 1983
Desmometopa interfrontalis Sabrosky, 1965
Desmometopa kandyensis Sabrosky, 1983
Desmometopa latigena (Sabrosky, 1930)
Desmometopa leptometopoides Sabrosky, 1983
Desmometopa lucidifrons Sabrosky, 1983
Desmometopa magnicornis Sabrosky, 1983
Desmometopa melanderi Sabrosky, 1983
Desmometopa meridionalis Sabrosky, 1983
Desmometopa microps Lamb, 1914
Desmometopa m-nigrum (Zetterstedt, 1848)
Desmometopa nearctica Sabrosky, 1983
Desmometopa nigeriae Sabrosky, 1983
Desmometopa nigrifemorata Brake & Freidberg, 2003
Desmometopa nigrohalteralis Sabrosky, 1983
Desmometopa nudigena Sabrosky, 1983
Desmometopa obscurifrons Sabrosky, 1983
Desmometopa palpalia (Wahlberg, 1848)
Desmometopa parafacialis Sabrosky, 1983
Desmometopa philippinensis Sabrosky, 1983
Desmometopa pleuralis Sabrosky, 1983
Desmometopa postorbitalis Sabrosky, 1983
Desmometopa propeciliata Sabrosky, 1983
Desmometopa sabroskyi Brake & Freidberg, 2003
Desmometopa saguaro Sabrosky, 1983
Desmometopa singaporensis Kertész, 1899
Desmometopa sordida (Fallén, 1820)
Desmometopa srilankae Sabrosky, 1983
Desmometopa stilbopleura Sabrosky, 1983
Desmometopa tarsalis Loew, 1866
Desmometopa terminalis Sabrosky, 1983
Desmometopa tristicula Hendel, 1914
Desmometopa varipalpis Malloch, 1927
Desmometopa woldai Sabrosky, 1983

References

Carnoidea genera
Taxa named by Hermann Loew
Milichiidae